Ukkola is a Finnish surname. Notable people with the surname include:

Pertti Ukkola (born 1950), Finnish wrestler
Riikka Ukkola (born 1968), Finnish swimmer
Tuulikki Ukkola (1943–2019), Finnish politician and journalist

Finnish-language surnames